Ole Gabriel Ueland (31 January 1931 – 5 April 2009) was a Norwegian politician from Varhaug, Rogaland, active in the Centre Party. He was a member of the Norwegian parliament from 1977 to 1993.

References

1931 births
2009 deaths
People from Hå
Centre Party (Norway) politicians
Members of the Storting
20th-century Norwegian politicians